Dandaneh may refer to:
 Dandaneh, Kermanshah
 Dandaneh, Razavi Khorasan